C7orf50 (Chromosome 7, Open Reading Frame 50) is a gene in humans (Homo sapiens) that encodes a protein known as C7orf50 (uncharacterized protein C7orf50). This gene is ubiquitously expressed in the kidneys, brain, fat, prostate, spleen, among 22 other tissues and demonstrates low tissue specificity.  C7orf50 is conserved in chimpanzees, Rhesus monkeys, dogs, cows, mice, rats, and chickens, along with 307 other organisms from mammals to fungi. This protein is predicted to be involved with the import of ribosomal proteins into the nucleus to be assembled into ribosomal subunits as a part of rRNA processing. Additionally, this gene is predicted to be a microRNA (miRNA) protein coding host gene, meaning that it may contain miRNA genes in its introns and/or exons.

Gene

Background 
C7orf50, also known as YCR016W, MGC11257, and LOC84310, is a protein coding gene of poor characterization in need of further research. This gene can be accessed on NCBI at the accession number NC_000007.14, on HGNC at the ID number 22421, on ENSEMBL at the ID ENSG00000146540, on GeneCards at GCID:GC07M000996, and on UniProtKB at the ID Q9BRJ6.

Location 
C7orf50 is located on the short arm of chromosome 7 (7p22.3), starting at base pair (bp) 977,964 and ending at bp 1,138,325. This gene spans 160,361 bps on the minus (-) strand and contains a total of 13 exons.

Gene Neighborhood 
Genes within the neighborhood of C7orf50 are the following: LOC105375120, GPR146, LOC114004405, LOC107986755, ZFAND2A, LOC102723758, LOC106799841, COX19, ADAP1, CYP2W1, MIR339, GPER1, and LOC101927021. This neighborhood extends from bp 89700 to bp 1165958 on chromosome 7.

mRNA

Alternative Splicing 
C7orf50 has a total of 7 experimentally curated mRNA transcripts. These transcripts are maintained independently of annotated genomes and were not generated computationally from a specific genome build such as the GRCh38.p13 primary assembly; therefore, they are typically more reliable. The longest and most complete of these transcripts (transcript 4) being 2138bp, producing a 194 amino acid-long (aa) protein, and consisting of 5 exons. Of these transcripts, four of them encode for the same 194aa protein (isoform a), only differing in their 5' and 3' untranslated regions (UTRs). The three other transcripts encode isoform b, c, and d, respectively. The table below is representative of these transcripts.

Alternatively, when the primary genomic assembly, GRCh38.p13, is used for annotation (NCBI: NC_000007.14), there are 10 computationally predicted mRNA transcripts. The most complete and supported of these transcripts (transcript variant X6) is 1896bp, producing a 225aa-long protein. In total, there are 6 different isoforms predicted for C7orf50. Of these transcripts, 5 of them encode for the same isoform (X3). The remaining transcripts encode isoforms X2, X4, X5, X6, and X7 as represented below.

5' and 3' UTR 
Based on the experimentally determined C7orf50 mRNA transcript variant 4, the 5' UTR of C7orf50 is 934 nucleotides (nt) long, while the 3' UTR is 619nt. The coding sequence (CDS) of this transcript spans nt 935..1519 for a total length of 584nt and is encoded in reading frame 2. Interestingly, the 5'UTR of C7orf50 contains a uORF in need of further study, ranging from nt 599 to nt 871 also in the second reading frame.

Protein

General Properties 
The C7orf50 Isoform a's 194aa protein sequence from NCBI  is as follows:
 >NP_001127867.1 uncharacterized protein C7orf50 isoform a [Homo sapiens]
 MAKQKRKVPEVTEKKNKKLKKASAEGPLLGPEAAPSGEGAGSKGEAVLRPGLDAEPELSPEEQRVLERKL 70
 KKERKKEERQRLREAGLVAQHPPARRSGAELALDYLCRWAQKHKNWRFQKTRQTWLLLHMYDSDKVPDEH 140
 FSTLLAYLEGLQGRARELTVQKAEALMRELDEEGSDPPLPGRAQRIRQVLQLLS                 194
The underlined region within the sequence is indicative of a domain known as DUF2373 ("domain of unknown function 2373"), found in isoforms a, b, and c.

C7orf50 has a predicted molecular weight (Mw) of 22 kDa, making C7orf50 smaller than the average protein (52 kDa). The isoelectric point (theoretical pI) for this isoform is 9.7, meaning that C7orf50 is slightly basic. As for charge runs and patterns within isoform a, there is a significant mixed charge (*) run (-++0++-+++--+) from aa67 to aa79 and an acidic (-) run from aa171 – aa173. It is likely that this mixed charge run encodes the protein-protein interaction (PPI) site of C7orf50.

Domains and Motifs 
DUF2373 is a domain of unknown function found in the C7orf50 protein. This is a highly conserved c-terminal region found from fungi to humans. As for motifs, a bipartite nuclear localization signal (NLS) was predicted from aa6 to aa21, meaning that C7orf50 is likely localized in the nucleus. Interestingly, a nuclear export signal (NES) is also found within the C7orf50 protein at the following amino acids: 150, and 153 - 155, suggesting that C7orf50 has function both inside and outside the nucleus.

Structure

Secondary Structure 
The majority of C7orf50 (isoform a) secondary structure is made up of alpha helices, with the remainder being small portions of random coils, beta turns, or extended strands.

Tertiary Structure 
The tertiary structure of C7orf50 consists primarily of alpha helices as determined I-TASSER.

Quaternary Structure 
The interaction network (quaternary structure) involving the C7orf50 protein has significantly more (p < 1.0e-16) interactions than a randomly selected set of proteins. This indicates that these proteins are partially connected biologically as a group; therefore, they intrinsically depend on each other within their biological pathway. This means that although the function of C7orf50 is uncharacterized, it is most likely to be associated with the same processes and functions as the proteins within its network.

The closest predicted functional partners of C7orf50 are the following proteins: DDX24, DDX52, PES1, EBNA1BP2, RSLD1, NOP14, FTSJ3, KRR1, LYAR, and PWP1. These proteins are predicted to co-express rather than bind directly C7orf50 and each other.

Regulation

Gene Regulation

Promoter 
C7orf50 has 6 predicted promoter regions. The promoter with the greatest number of transcripts and CAGE tags overall is promoter set 6 (GXP_6755694) on ElDorado by Genomatix. This promoter region is on the minus (-) strand and has a start position of 1,137,965 and an end position of 1,139,325, making this promoter 1,361bp long. It has 16 coding transcripts and the transcript with the greatest identity to C7orf50 transcript 4 is transcript GXT_27788039 with 98746 CAGE tags.

The CpG island associated with this promoter has 75 CpGs (22% of island), and is 676bp long. The C count plus G count is 471, the percentage C or G is 70% within this island, and the ratio of observed to expected CpG is 0.91.

Transcription Factor Binding Sites 
As determined by MatInspector at Genomatix, the following transcription factor (TFs) families are most highly predicted to bind to C7orf50 in the promoter region.

Expression Pattern
C7orf50 shows ubiquitous expression in the kidneys, brain, fat, prostrate, spleen and 22 other tissues and low tissue and immune cell specificity . This expression is very high, 4 times above the average gene; therefore, there is a higher abundance of C7orf50 mRNA than the average gene within a cell. There does not appear to be a definitive cell type in which this gene is not expressed.

Transcription Regulation

Splice Enhancers 
The mRNA of C7orf50 is predicted to have exonic splicing enhancers, in which SR proteins can bind, at bp positions 45 (SRSF1 (IgM-BRCA1)), 246 (SRSF6), 703 (SRSF5), 1301 (SRSF1), and 1308 (SRSF2)

Stem Loop Prediction 
Both the 5' and 3' UTRs of the mRNA of C7orf50 are predicted to fold into structures such as bulge loops, internal loops, multibranch loops, hairpin loops, and double helices. The 5'UTR has a predicted free energy of -416 kcal/mol with an ensemble diversity of 238. The 3' UTR has a predicted free energy of -279 kcal/mol with an ensemble diversity of 121.

miRNA Targeting 
There are many poorly conserved miRNA binding sites predicted within the 3’UTR of C7orf50 mRNA. The notable miRNA families that are predicted to bind to C7orf50 mRNA and regulate/repress transcription are the following: miR-138-5p, miR-18-5p, miR-129-3p, miR-124-3p.1, miR-10-5p, and miR-338-3p.

Protein Regulation

Subcellular Localization 
The C7orf50 protein is predicted to localize intercellularly in both the nucleus and cytoplasm, but primarily within the nucleoplasm and nucleoli.

Post-Translational Modification 
The C7orf50 protein is predicted to be mucin-type GalNAc o-glycosylated at the following amino acid sites: 12, 23, 36, 42, 59, and 97. Additionally, this protein is predicted to be SUMOylated at aa71 with the SUMO protein binding from aa189 through aa193. C7orf50 is also predicted to be kinase-specific phosphorylated at the following amino acids: 12, 23, 36, 42, 59, 97, 124, 133, 159, and 175. Interestingly, many of these sites overlap with the o-glycosylation sites. Of these phosphorylation sites, the majority are serines (53%) with the remainder being either tyrosines or threnonines. The most associated kinases with these sites are the following kinase groups: AGC, CAMK, TKL, and STE. Finally, this protein is predicted to have 8 glycations of the ε amino groups of lysines at the following sites: aa3, 5, 14, 15, 17, 21, 76, and 120.

Homology

Paralogs 
No paralogs of C7orf50 have been detected in the human genome; however, there is slight evidence (58% similarity) of a paralogous DUF2373 domain in the protein of KIDINS220.

Orthologs 
Below is a table of a variety of orthologs of the human C7orf50 gene. The table includes closely, moderately, and distantly related orthologs. C7orf50 is highly evolutionary conserved from mammals to fungi. When these ortholog sequences are compared, the most conserved portions are those of DUF2373, highlighting this domain's importance in the functioning of C7orf50. C7orf50 has evolved moderately and evenly over time with a divergence rate greater than Hemoglobin but less than Cytochrome C.

Function 
The consensus prediction of C7orf50 function (GO terms), as determined by I-TASSER, predicts the molecular function to be protein binding, the biological process to be protein import (specifically into the nucleus), and the associated cellular component to be a pore complex (specifically of the nuclear envelope). It can be predicted that the function of C7orf50 is one in which C7orf50 imports ribosomal proteins into the nucleus in order to be made into ribosomes, but further research is needed to solidify this function.

Interacting Proteins

Clinical Significance 
C7orf50 has been noted in a variety of genome-wide association studies (GWAS) and has been shown to be associated with type 2 diabetes among sub-Saharan Africans, daytime sleepiness in African-Americans, prenatal exposure to particulate matter, heritable DNA methylation marks associated with breast cancer, DNA methylation in relation to plasma carotenoids and lipid profile, and has significant interactions with prion proteins.

References 

Genes on human chromosome 7